Meyers House in Hillsboro, New Mexico was built in c.1902.  It is an L-shaped one-story house with Late Victorian vernacular architecture.

It was home of Charles H. Meyers, who immigrated from Germany as a stowaway in about 1860.  He prospected for silver in Lake Valley and prospected for gold in Hillsboro, then opened The Green Room saloon in Hillsboro.

It was listed on the National Register of Historic Places in 1995.

See also

National Register of Historic Places listings in Sierra County, New Mexico

References

Houses on the National Register of Historic Places in New Mexico
Houses completed in 1902
Houses in Sierra County, New Mexico
National Register of Historic Places in Sierra County, New Mexico